Aurélie Védy (born 8 February 1981) is a French former professional tennis player.

On 15 May 2006, she achieved her career-high singles ranking of world No. 260. On 4 May 2009, Védy peaked at No. 85 in the doubles rankings. In her career, she won six singles and 33 doubles titles on the ITF Women's Circuit.

Védy retired from professional tennis 2013.

WTA career finals

Doubles: 1 (runner-up)

ITF Circuit finals

Singles: 11 (6 titles, 5 runner-ups)

Doubles: 56 (33 titles, 23 runner-ups)

External links
 
 

1981 births
Living people
French female tennis players
20th-century French women
21st-century French women